Empress Hui'an (惠安皇后) was the concubine of Emperor Yizong of Tang (Li Cui).

Life 
Her family background is unknown except for the fact that her surname is Wang (王). During Emperor Yizong's reign, she held the rank of Noble Consort (贵妃). 

In the seventh year of Emperor Yizong's reign, she died. 

When her son Li Xuan inherited the throne, she gave her the posthumous title of Empress Hui'an (惠安皇后)

References 

 "BaoKe Cong Bian·VolumeEight" Tang Wei Baoheng wrote the official book of the second year and the seal of the second year of Xiantong "Jing Zhao Jin Shilu" The tomb of the Queen Mother of Hui'an of Tang Yizong in Tang Dynasty "Jing Zhao Jin Shi Lu" Stele of Yang Gong, the servant of the Tang Dynasty [……]

Tang dynasty people
Concubines